Chris Harrison (born February 25, 1972) is a former American football guard for the Detroit Lions of the National Football League (NFL).

Harrison is now the proprietor of Plant 64 as well as C. A. Harrison Companies.

References

Virginia Cavaliers football players
Detroit Lions players
Baltimore Ravens players
Players of American football from Maryland
1972 births
Living people
American football offensive guards